Nicaragua is a country in Central America with  constitutional democracy with executive, legislative, judicial, and electoral branches of government. The President of Nicaragua is both head of state and head of government. Executive power is exercised by the government.

Legislative power is vested in the National Assembly. The judiciary and electoral powers are independent of the executive and the legislature. The magistrates of both the Supreme Court (CSJ) and the Supreme Electoral Council (CSE) are appointed by the President and ratified by the National Assembly.

Executive branch

The current composition of the Executive Branch includes President Daniel Ortega and the Vice-President Rosario Murillo. The cabinet ministers and the directors of government agencies and autonomous entities are appointed by the President, then confirmed by the National Assembly.

Cabinet

President of the Republic: Daniel Ortega
Secretary of the Presidency: Paul Oquist Kelley
Minister of Agriculture and Forestry: Edward Centeno
Minister of Defense: Martha Elena Ruiz Sevilla
Minister of Education, Culture and Sports: Miriam Raudez
Minister of Energy and Mines: Salvador Mansell Castrillo
Minister of the Environment and Natural Resources: Juana Argenal
Minister of Family: Marcia Ramirez Mercado
Minister of Finance and Public Credit: Iván Acosta Montalván
Minister of Foreign Affairs: Denis Moncada Colindres
Minister of Governance: Maria Amelia Coronel
Minister of Health: Martha Reyes
Minister of Industry, Development and Commerce: Orlando Solorzano
Minister of Labor: Alba Luz Torrez Briones 
Minister of Transport and Infrastructure: Pablo Fernández Martínez Espinoza

Ministries and dependent entities

Nicaraguan Institute of Sport (Instituto Nicaragüense de Deportes, IND), originally named INJUDE; website
Ministry of Agriculture and Forestry (Ministerio Agropecuario y Forestal, MAG-FOR); website  
National Forestry Institute (Instituto Nacional Forestal, INAFOR); website
Nicaraguan Institute of Agricultural Technology (Instituto Nicaragüense de Tecnología Agropecuaria (INTA); website
Ministry of Education, Culture and Sports (Ministerio de Educación, Cultura y Deportes, MECD); website
National Technological Institute (Instituto Nacional Tecnológico, INTECNA)
Nicaraguan Institute of Culture (Instituto Nicaragüense de Cultura, INC)
Ministry of the Environment and Natural Resources (Ministerio del Ambiente y los Recursos Naturales, MARENA); website
Ministry of Family (Ministerio de la Familia, MIFAMILIA); website
Nicaraguan Institute for Women (Instituto Nicaragüense de la Mujer, INIM)
Ministry of Finance and Public Credit (Ministerio de Hacienda y Crédito Público, MHCP); website
General Customs Bureau (Dirección General de Aduanas, DGA); website 
General Revenue Service (Dirección General de Ingresos, DGI); website
Ministry of Foreign Affairs (Ministerio de Relaciones Exteriores, MINREX); website 
Ambassadors of Nicaragua (Embajadores de la Republica de Nicaragua)
Ministry of Governance (Ministerio de Gobernación, MIGOB); website
General Directorate of Migration and Alienage (Dirección General de Migración y Extranjería, DGME); website
National Penitentiary System (Sistema Penitenciario Nacional, SPN)
National Police (Policia Nacional, PN); website
Social Security Institute and Human Development (Instituto de Seguridad Social y Desarrollo Humano, ISS-DHU)
Ministry of Health (Ministerio de Salud, MINSA); website 
Institute Against Alcoholism and Drug Addiction (Instituto Contra el Alcoholismo y la Drogadicción, ICAD)
Centro de Insumos para la Salud, CIPS, Government-owned corporation.
Centro de Mantenimiento de Equipos Médicos, Government-owned corporation.
Empresa de Insumos no Médicos, Government-owned corporation.
Hospital Alemán, Government-owned hospital.
Policlínica Oriental, Government-owned health-care center.
Ministry of Industry and Commercefont (Ministerio de Fomento, Industria y Comercio, MIFIC); website
Nicaraguan Institute of Support for the Small and Medium-sized Enterprises (Instituto Nicaragüense de Apoyo a la Pequeña y Mediana Empresa, INPYME); website
Nicaraguan Institute of Tourism (Nicaraguan Institute of Tourism, INTUR); website
Corporation of Free Trade Zones (Corporación de Zonas Francas, CZF); website
Empresa Nicaragüense de Alimentos Básicos, ENABAS, Government-owned enterprise devoted to internal trade, mostly grains.
Ministry of Labor (Ministerio del Trabajo, MITRAB)
National Technological Institute (Instituto Nacional Tecnológico, INATEC); website - Vocational education centers.
Ministry of Transport and Infrastructure (Ministerio de Transporte e Infraestructura, MTI); website
Corporation of Regional Constructor Companies (Corporación de Empresas Regionales de la Construcción, CREC)
Ministry of Defense (Ministerio de Defensa, MIDEF); website
Military Social Security Institute (Instituto de Previsión Social Militar, IPSM); website
National System of Prevention, Relieves and Attention to Disasters (Sistema Nacional para la Prevención, Mitigación y Atención de Desastres, SINAPRED); website

Decentralized entities

Central Bank of Nicaragua - (Banco Central de Nicaragua, BCN); website
National Institute of Statistics and Census (Instituto Nacional de Estadísticas y Censos, INEC); website
Institute of Rural Development (Instituto de Desarrollo Rural, IDR); website
National Energy Commission (Comisión Nacional de Energía, CNE); website
Nicaraguan Institute of Aqueducts and Drains (Instituto Nicaragüense de Acueductos y Alcaltarillados, INAA); website - Regulatory entity of public services.
Nicaraguan Institute of Municipal Development (Instituto Nicaragüense de Fomento Municipal, INIFOM); website
Nicaraguan Institute of Telecommunications and Postal Services (Instituto Nicaragüense de Telecomunicaciones y Correos, TELCOR). Regulatory entity of public services. Website
Nicaraguan Institute of Territorial Studies (Instituto Nicaragüense de Estudios Territoriales, INETER); website
Nicaraguan Institute of the Urban and Rural Housing (Instituto de la Vivienda Urbana y Rural, INVUR); website
Office of the Attorney General (Procuraduría General de Justicia)
Social Emergency Investment Fund (Fondo de Inversión Social de Emergencia, FISE); website

Government-owned enterprises

General

National Corporations of the Public Sector (Corporaciones Nacionales del Sector Público, CORNAP)
National Lottery (Lotería Nacional); website

Dependencies of the Presidency

Channel 6 (Canal 6 de Televisión), not in use.
National Printing Works (Imprenta Nacional), in process of privatization.
Olof Palme Convention Center (Centro de Convenciones Olof Palme), in process of privatization.
Radio Nicaragua website

Financial services

Nicaraguan Institute of Insurances and Reinsurances (Instituto Nicaragüense de Seguros y Reaseguros, INISER); website
Nicaraguan Investment Fund (Financiera Nicaragüense de Inversiones, S.A. FNI); website - The Government holds a 51% share of the investment bank.
Rural Credit Fund (Fondo de Crédito Rural, FCR)

Public services

International Airport Administration Company (Empresa Administradora de Aeropuertos Internacionales, EAAI); website
Nicaraguan Aqueducts and Sewer Company (Empresa Nacional de Acueductos y Alcantarillados, ENACAL); website - National water company.
National Electric Transmission Company (Empresa Nacional de Transmisión Eléctrica, ENTRESA); website
Nicaraguan Electricity Company (Empresa Nicaragüense de Electricidad, ENEL)
National Port Authority (Empresa Portuaria Nacional, EPN); website
Nicaraguan Postal Service (Correos de Nicaragua); website

Legislative branch

Judicial branch

 http://www.poderjudicial.gob.ni/

Autonomous entities

 Comptroller General of the Republic of Nicaragua (Contraloria General de la República); website
Human Rights Prosecutor's Office (Procuraduría de los Derechos Humanos)
Intendence of Property (Intendencia de la Propiedad)
Nicaraguan Institute of Energy (Instituto Nicaragüense de Energía, INE); website - Regulatory entity of public services.
Superintendence of Banks and other Financial Institutions - (Superintendencia de Bancos y Otras Instituciones Financieras, SIBOIF); website
Superintendence of Pensions (Superintendencia de Pensiones, SIP); website
Nicaraguan Social Security Institute (Instituto Nicaragüense de Seguridad Social, INSS); website
Public Prosecutor's Office (Ministerio Público); website

References